"Rolling Star" is the seventh single of Japanese singer-songwriter Yui released January 17, 2007, and her first under the official Studioseven Recordings label. This single has been certified Gold by RIAJ. The music video was directed by Takahiro Miki.

Track listing

Commercial endorsements
"Rolling Star" is used as fifth opening of the popular anime series Bleach. This would be Yui's second time to have one of her songs used in the show, as her third single, "Life", was used as the fifth closing theme. In addition, the instrumental version of Rolling Star was used in a Fairchild TV commercial for a singing competition in 2008.

Charts

Oricon Sales Chart (Japan)

Popular culture
The song was used in the fifth opening theme for the anime, Bleach.

References

2007 singles
Yui (singer) songs
Bleach (manga) songs
Songs written by Yui (singer)
2007 songs